Melocactus matanzanus, common name dwarf Turk's-cap cactus or Turk's-cap cactus, is a cactus in the genus Melocactus of the family Cactaceae. The epithet matanzanus is derived from the Cuban province of Matanzas.

Description
Melocactus matanzanus is a perennial fleshy globose plant. On the bright green body there are 8–9 (or more) ribs. The thorns are brownish-gray or white.

When the plant has reached a certain age it shows at the growing tip a cephalium (hence the common name of "Turk's Cap"), a globose structure covered with reddish-brown bristles.

Distribution
This plant is native to the north-central area of Cuba. It is a popular and desirable species throughout the world as an ornamental plant.

References
 
 
 
 Cacti Guide
 Bihrmann.com
 Desert-tropicals

matanzanus
Flora of Cuba
Plants described in 1934
Flora without expected TNC conservation status